The Democratic Progressive Azad Party ( DPAP) formerly Democratic Azad Party is an Indian political party formed by Ghulam Nabi Azad on 26 September 2022 in Jammu and Kashmir. The party's top three agendas in Jammu and Kashmir are restoration of full statehood, right to land and employment to native domiciles. The party's ideology is based on the ideals of Mahatma Gandhi.

Name
The name of the Democractic Azad Party was announced by Ghulam Nabi Azad on 26 September 2022. He received almost 1,500 names in Sanskrit, Hindi, and Urdu as suggestion for name of the party. He preferred this one since it contains a Hindustani term. On 18 November 2022, Election Commission of India rejected the name and asked Azad to change it. In December 2022, the final name of the Democratic Azad Party was changed to Democratic Progressive Azad Party.

History
On 26 August 2022, Azad announced his resignation from the Congress Party in a public letter after launching a scathing attack on the top leadership, particularly Rahul Gandhi. After the resignation of Azad, J&K's Congress including former ministers R.S. Chib,  Ghulam Mohammad Saroori and Abdul Rashid; former MLAs Mohammad Amin Bhat, Gulzar Ahmad Wani and Choudhary Mohammad Akram; former MLC Naresh Gupta and party leader Salman Nizami resigned from the basic membership of the Congress party in support of Ghulam Nabi Azad. 

In response to Azad's resignation, the Congress initially questioned the timing of his decision before launching a vicious counterattack and accusing that he was working closely with the BJP. Azad received criticism from a number of Congress officials, including the party's two chief ministers, Ashok Gehlot and Bhupesh Baghel.

On 29 August 2022, four politicians from Congress, including former deputy speaker of the Jammu and Kashmir Assembly Gulam Hyder Malik, two MLCs viz. Subash Gupta from Kathua and Sham Lal Bhagat from Doda, General secretary of the Jammu and Kashmir Congress Maheshwar Singh Manhas, and 12 workers of the Apni Party from Doda, including its district president Asgar Hussain Khanday, District general secretary Virender Kumar Sharma, and district vice-president (women's wing) Promila Sharma also resigned from their respective political parties in support of Ghulam Nabi Azad.

On 30 August 2022, former deputy chief of Jammu and Kashmir Tara Chand, along with former ministers Abdul Majid Wani, Manohar Lal Sharma, Gharu Ram Bhagat, and Balwan Singh, among 64 others, jointly resigned from the Congress party.

On 31 August 2022, 42 more politicians from Congress party resigned from their basic membership of Congress to join Azad's new political party.

On 1 September 2022, more than 36 Congress leaders—including Anirudh Raina, State Vice President NSUI and Manik Sharma, General Secretary of the National Students' Union of India (NSUI), the party's student wing—from several universities in Jammu submitted their resignations in support of Ghulam Nabi Azad.

On 2 September 2022, Congress leader Rajinder Prasad from Rajouri resigned in favour of Azad after criticising Congress party's functioning.

On 4 September 2022, Azad announced the formation of a new political party after resigning from Congress. He said the people of Jammu and Kashmir will decide the name and the flag for the new party.

On 26 September 2022, Azad launched his party as Democratic Azad Party.

On 22 December 2022, Azad expelled three leaders from party including Tara Chand, Dr. Manohar Lal and Balwan Singh for 'anti-party' activities.

Flag

The DAP's flag is made up of the colours mustard, white, and dark blue. White denotes peace, blue denotes freedom, wide space, imagination, and limits from the depths of the ocean to the heights of the sky, according to Azad, while mustard denotes creativity and unity in variety.

Organisation and structure

President

Treasurer

General Secretaries

Chief Spokesperson

Spokesperson

Media Coordinators & Additional Spokesperson

Social Media Coordinators

State Committee Jammu & Kashmir

Vice Chairman
 G. M. Saroori

References

National political parties in India
Indian National Congress breakaway groups